Pleasant Goat and Big Big Wolf: Mission Incredible: Adventures on the Dragon's Trail is a 2012 Chinese animated film based on the animated television series Pleasant Goat and Big Big Wolf. It is preceded by Moon Castle: The Space Adventure (2011) and is followed by The Mythical Ark: Adventures in Love & Happiness (2013).

In the film, Weslie and his crew discover an evil mechanical dragon who defeats Wolffy as he was attempting to capture the goats, but a series of good dragons rescue Weslie and the goats. The good dragons say that evil dragons have taken over their world, and they need the help of the goats.

Characters

Lambs
 Weslie (喜羊羊 Xǐ Yángyáng) - Zu Liqing (祖丽晴) in Mandarin
 Slowy (慢羊羊 Màn Yángyáng) - Gao Quansheng (高全胜) in Mandarin
 Tibbie (美羊羊 Měi Yángyáng) - Deng Yuting (邓玉婷) in Mandarin
 Paddi (懒羊羊 Lǎn Yángyáng) - Liang Ying (梁颖) in Mandarin
 Sparky (沸羊羊 Fèi Yángyáng) - Liu Hongyun (刘红韵) in Mandarin
 Jonie (暖羊羊 Nuǎn Yángyáng) - Deng Yuting in Mandarin
Wolves
 Wolffy (灰太狼 Huī Tàiláng) - Zhang Lin (张琳) in Mandarin
 Wolnie (红太狼 Hóng Tàiláng) - Zhao Na in Mandarin
 Wilie (小灰灰 Xiǎo Huīhuī) - Liang Ying in Mandarin
Dragons
 Chamelon (变色龙 Biànsèlóng "Chameleon") - Liu Hongyun in Mandarin
 Molle (轰龙龙 Hōng Lónglóng "Red Dragon")
 Orito (钻地龙 Zuāndì Lóng "Drill Earth Dragon")
 Quinto (朦朦龙 Méngméng Lóng "Deceive Dragon")
 Raho (七窍玲龙 Qīqiàolíng Lóng "No Human Head Feature (Eye, ear, nostril, mouth) Dragon")
 Drago (小黑龙 Xiǎo Hēilóng "Little Black Dragon")
 Drago appears as an innocent victim of the Tyranno-Rex, but he turns out to be the operator of it.
 Xiao Shen Long (小神龙 Xiǎo Shénlóng "Little Divine/Mysterious Dragon") - Luo Yanqian (骆妍倩) in Mandarin
 Xiao Shen Long teaches the goats and the wolves kung fu. The placement of Xiao Shen Long, a dragon who knows kung fu, was made, according to The Standard, "to maximize monetization potentials." The Walt Disney Company and Toon Express made an agreement to share licensing income generated from sales of merchandise with Xiao Shen Long for a three-year period.
 Archaeo (蝶龙 Diélóng "Butterfly Dragon")

References

External links

Mission Incredible: Adventures on the Dragon's Trail  (Index SWF)
Main page (Main SWF)

Chinese animated films
2012 animated films
2012 films
Pleasant Goat and Big Big Wolf films
Animated films about dragons